Pedro Felipe De Faria Rangel (born 29 June 2000), known as Pedro Rangel, is a Brazilian footballer who plays as a goalkeeper for Fluminense.

Club career
Born in Nepomuceno, Pedro Rangel began his career at the age of sixteen with Santana, before joining Itapirense. In February 2019, he joined top flight side Fluminense on loan. Having impressed on loan, Pedro Rangel joined Fluminense permanently ahead of the 2021 season, as a replacement for Marcelo Pitaluga, who had moved to English side Liverpool.

He made his professional debut for Fluminense in a surprise 2–1 loss to Resende in the Campeonato Carioca on 5 March 2021. The following year, despite not featuring for Fluminense in any competition, he signed a new contract until 2026. He returned to first-team action in the 2023 season, making his first appearances in front of fans for Fluminense, as the games he had previously played in had featured no spectators due to the COVID-19 pandemic in Brazil.

Career statistics

Club

References

2000 births
Living people
Sportspeople from Minas Gerais
Brazilian footballers
Association football goalkeepers
Sociedade Esportiva Itapirense players
Fluminense FC players